The 1937 Titleholders Championship was contested from January 15–17 at Augusta Country Club. It was the 1st edition of the Titleholders Championship.

This event was won by Patty Berg.

Round summaries

First round

Second round

Final round

External links
The Evening Independent source
Herald-Journal source
The News and Courier source
The Sunday Morning Star source
Painesville Telegraph source
Reading Eagle source

Titleholders Championship
Golf in Georgia (U.S. state)
Titleholders Championship
Titleholders Championship
Titleholders Championship
Titleholders Championship
Women's sports in Georgia (U.S. state)